Rohana is a genus of butterflies in the family Nymphalidae.

Species
Rohana parisatis (Westwood, 1850) – black prince
Rohana tonkiniana Fruhstorfer, 1906
Rohana nakula (Moore, [1858])
Rohana ruficincta Lathy, 1913
Rohana rhea (C. & R. Felder, 1863)
Rohana macar Wallace, 1869 – Wallace's black prince
Rohana parvata (Moore, 1857) – brown prince

References
"Rohana Moore, [1880]" at Markku Savela's Lepidoptera and Some Other Life Forms

Apaturinae
Taxa named by Frederic Moore
Nymphalidae genera